Peter Christensen (born 25 April 1975) is a Danish ex-politician. He represented Venstre. He is an electrician by profession and was a Member of Parliament from 2001 to 2015. He served as Chairman of Venstres Ungdom from 1999 to 2001. 

He replaced Troels Lund Poulsen as Minister for Taxation of Denmark from 8 March to 3 October 2011. Thor Möger Pedersen succeeded him as Minister for Taxation. On 30 September 2015, he replaced Carl Holst as Minister of Defence, who stepped down, following a list of personal scandals.

References

External links 

 
Official homepage

1975 births
Living people
Members of the Folketing 2001–2005
Members of the Folketing 2005–2007
Members of the Folketing 2007–2011
Members of the Folketing 2011–2015
Government ministers of Denmark
Danish Tax Ministers